can refer to:
Yamanouchi Station (Hiroshima), a train station on JR West's Geibi Line
Yamanouchi Station (Kyoto), a train station on Keifuku Electric Railroad's Arashiyama Main Line